HP Networking offers trainings, typically delivered in HP Authorized Trainings Centers (ATCs) by HP Certified Instructors (HPCI).

HP Networking training is an evolution of what HP ProCurve offered as training.

The titles are oriented at the HP Certified Professional Program (HPCP). Candidates can take most of the technical certification tests at Prometric Testcenters. Sales certification tests can be taken online in the Internet. Attending a course is currently not a prerequisite for achieving the titles. Annual based recertification can be achieved via Continuous Learning Program of HPCP.

Sales

Sales Training enables IT resellers the ability to competently sell the vendors products.

ASP
The Accredited Sales Professional (ASP) certifies that someone knowledgeable of networking concepts, like the OSI Model, and can describe the features & functions ProCurve products.
 ASP  can be done online at

ASC
The Accredited Sales Consultant (ASC) expands sales skills, to provide the ability to engage customers at the board level to understand business issues, and to design a solution that will meet evolving networking requirements.
 ASC

Technical

Technical Training enables Network Engineers, to understand the concepts and correct operation of the vendors products.

APS
The Accredited Platform Specialist (APS) will give Service technicians the ability to restore a single ProCurve Networking product (including hardware and internal operating system) to operational level as from factory.
 Installation and Service

AIS
The Accredited Integration Specialist (AIS)  is the first level of technical certification. ProCurve Networking Primer (Free CBT) is an optional course. The qualification comprises
 Adaptive Edge Fundamentals

ASE
The Accredited Systems Engineer (ASE) has three specialisations - Mobility , WAN  and Network Management . The AIS is a prerequisite before achieving this qualification.

The following are optional, but recommended, and are useful for some pre-knowledge:
 IP Routing Foundations (Free CBT) (optional)
 Network Security Fundamentals (Free CBT) (optional)
 Fundamental WAN Technologies (Free CBT) (optional)

The student must pass the following exams:
 Building ProCurve Resilient, Adaptive Networks (BPRAN) 
 Security 

To achieve the different specialisation, one of the following must be passed:
 Mobility 
 Secure WAN 
 Network Management

MASE
The Master Accredited Systems Engineer (MASE) has three specializations - Secure Mobility , Security Specialist  and Convergence 

Both the AIS and one ASE qualification are prerequisites before achieving this qualification.

To achieve the MASE Secure Mobility Specialist, the student must have also passed the ASE - ProCurve Networking & Mobility certification. The following must then be passed:
 Secure Mobility Solutions 

To achieve the MASE Security Specialist, the student must have also passed the ASE - ProCurve Network Management certification.  The following must then be passed:
 Network Access Control 
 Network Immunity 

To achieve the MASE Convergence Specialist, the student can have passed ANY ASE certification, plus a VoIP Certification from the following vendors:
 3Com
 Alcatel
 Avaya
 Cisco
 Ericsson
 Mitel
 NEC
 Nortel
 Siemens

References

External links
 ProCurve Networking by HP Worldwide Website
 ProCurve Training Homepage
 ProCurve Exam Matrix
 HP Certified Professional Homepage
 Prometric Homepage

ProCurve